Gardiner is a Dispersed Rural Community and unincorporated place in geographic Blount Township, Cochrane District, Ontario, Canada. The community is also astride the Ontario Northland Railway line from Cochrane to Moosonee, but is not served by Polar Bear Express passenger trains.

References

Other map sources:

Communities in Cochrane District